Prigorodny is a rural locality (a settlement) in Solyansky Selsoviet, Narimanovsky District, Astrakhan Oblast, Russia. The population was 833 as of 2010. There are 24 streets.

Geography 
Prigorodny is located 38 km south of Narimanov (the district's administrative centre) by road. Solyanka is the nearest rural locality.

References 

Rural localities in Narimanovsky District